John ("Johnny") Nolasco Hughes (born August 15, 1975 in La Romana, Dominican Republic) is a featherweight boxer from the Dominican Republic, who won the bronze medal at the 1995 Pan American Games in Mar del Plata, Argentina. A year later he represented his native country at the 1996 Summer Olympics. Nolasco made his professional debut on March 17, 1999.

References
 
 Profile

1975 births
Living people
Featherweight boxers
Olympic boxers of the Dominican Republic
Boxers at the 1996 Summer Olympics
Boxers at the 1995 Pan American Games
People from La Romana, Dominican Republic
Dominican Republic male boxers
Pan American Games bronze medalists for the Dominican Republic
Pan American Games medalists in boxing
Central American and Caribbean Games bronze medalists for the Dominican Republic
Competitors at the 1993 Central American and Caribbean Games
Central American and Caribbean Games medalists in boxing
Medalists at the 1995 Pan American Games
20th-century Dominican Republic people
21st-century Dominican Republic people